FETO may refer to:

 FETÖ, "Fethullahist Terrorist Organisation", is a term used by the government of Turkey to refer to the Islamist fraternal movement led by Fethullah Gülen.
 From Enslavement to Obliteration, an album by Napalm Death